The United Nations Educational, Scientific and Cultural Organization (UNESCO) designates World Heritage Sites of outstanding universal value to cultural or natural heritage which have been nominated by countries which are signatories to the UNESCO World Heritage Convention, established in 1972. Cultural heritage consists of monuments (such as architectural works, monumental sculptures, or inscriptions), groups of buildings, and sites (including archaeological sites). Natural features (consisting of physical and biological formations), geological and physiographical formations (including habitats of threatened species of animals and plants), and natural sites which are important from the point of view of science, conservation or natural beauty, are defined as natural heritage. India accepted the convention on 14 November 1977, making its sites eligible for inclusion on the list.

, there are 40 World Heritage Sites located in India. Out of these, 32 are cultural, 7 are natural, and one, the Khangchendzonga National Park, is of mixed type. India has the sixth largest number of sites in the world. The first sites to be listed were the Ajanta Caves, Ellora Caves, Agra Fort, and Taj Mahal, all of which were inscribed in the 1983 session of the World Heritage Committee. The most recent site listed was Dholavira, in 2021. At different times, two sites were listed as endangered: the Manas Wildlife Sanctuary was listed between 1992 and 2011 due to poaching and activities of the Bodo militias, and the monuments at Hampi were listed between 1999 and 2006 due to risks from increased traffic and new constructions in surroundings. One site is transnational, The Architectural Work of Le Corbusier is shared with six other countries. In addition, India has 52 sites on its tentative list.



World Heritage Sites 
UNESCO lists sites under ten criteria; each entry must meet at least one of the criteria. Criteria i through vi are cultural, and vii through x are natural.

Tentative list
In addition to sites inscribed on the World Heritage List, member states can maintain a list of tentative sites that they may consider for nomination. Nominations for the World Heritage List are only accepted if the site was previously listed on the tentative list. , India lists 52 properties on its tentative list.

See also
 National Geological Monuments of India
 Monuments of National Importance of India
 List of rock-cut temples in India
 List of forts in India
 List of museums in India
 Tourism in India

References

External links

 
World Heritage Sites
India
Historic preservation in India
Architecture in India